Curtis Robinson (born June 2, 1998) is an American football inside linebacker for the San Francisco 49ers of the National Football League (NFL). He played college football at Stanford.

College career
Robinson was a member of the Stanford Cardinal for five seasons. He finished his collegiate career with 144 tackles, three sacks, two forced fumbles, and one fumble recovery with one interception and five passes broken up in 45 games played.

Professional career

Denver Broncos
Robinson signed with the Denver Broncos as an undrafted free agent on May 1, 2021, shortly after the conclusion of the 2021 NFL Draft. He was waived during final roster cuts on August 31, 2021, but was signed to the team's practice squad the next day. Robinson was elevated to the active roster on October 2, 2021, for the team's week 4 game against the Baltimore Ravens and made his NFL debut in the game. Robinson was signed to the Broncos' active roster on October 19, 2021. He was waived on October 26, and re-signed to the practice squad. He was released on November 30.

San Francisco 49ers
On December 6, 2021, Robinson was signed to the San Francisco 49ers practice squad. He signed a reserve/future contract with the 49ers on February 2, 2022.

On August 31, 2022, Robinson was placed on injured reserve. He was activated on October 15. He was waived on December 23 and re-signed to the practice squad.

References

External links
Stanford Cardinal bio
Denver Broncos bio

1998 births
Living people
Players of American football from California
American football linebackers
Stanford Cardinal football players
Denver Broncos players
San Francisco 49ers players
Sportspeople from Irvine, California